Crawford Township is a township in Cherokee County, Kansas, USA.  As of the 2000 census, its population was 646.

Geography
According to the USGS, it contains five cemeteries: Bethlehem, Columbus, County Home, Park and Timberhill Oak Hill.

References
 USGS Geographic Names Information System (GNIS)

External links
 City-Data.com

Townships in Cherokee County, Kansas
Townships in Kansas